Piane Sesia is a frazione  of the comune of Serravalle Sesia, in the province of Vercelli, Piedmont, northern Italy. Piane, that count around 400-500 inhabitants, is furthermore divided into 10 cantoni: Mazzone, Naula, Martellone, Imbricco, Quazzo, Bertola, San Giacomo, Castorino, Gattera and Sella.

Attractions include the St. Charles oratory (ca. 1650), the church of St. James (1624) the Pieve of Santa Maria di Naula, possibly built over an ancient pagan temple. The current structure was built in the 11th century and largely restored in the 19th century.

In the territory of Piane the highest point is the Pietra Groana (also spelled Croana), 699 m above the sea level. 
It hosts a maintained mountain refugee and the 130-metre-tall rock wall is used a training ground by climbers.

Cities and towns in Piedmont